Candalides coerulea is a species of butterfly of the family Lycaenidae. It was described by Röber in 1886. It is found on the Aru Islands and in West Irian.

Subspecies
Candalides coerulea coerulea (Aru)
Candalides coerulea subrosea (Grose-Smith, 1894) (West Irian: Humboldt Bay)
Candalides coerulea doreia (Tite, 1963) (north-western West Irian, Mount Goliath)

References

Candalidini
Butterflies described in 1886
Butterflies of Indonesia
Taxa named by Julius Röber